This is a list of released and upcoming video games developed in Austria. The list is sorted by game title, platform, year of release, their developer and their publisher

References

Notes

Citations

Video games developed in Austria
Austria
Video games developed